Furber may refer to:

In people
 Alex Furber (b. 1987), Canadian actor
 Aurilla Furber (1847–1898), American poet, writer, editor, activist
 Darcy Furber, Canadian politician
 Douglas Furber (1885–1961), British lyricist and playwright
 Edward Price Furber (1864–1940), British obstetrician and surgeon
 Holden Furber (1903–1993), American professor
 Joseph W. Furber (1814–1884), American politician
 Mike Furber (1948–1973), English-born entertainer
 Robert Furber (1674–1756), British horticulturist and author
 Steve Furber (b. 1953), British professor
 William H. Furber, American politician

Other uses
 John P. Furber House, historic house in Cottage Grove, Minnesota, US